Yoshifumi Fujisawa (born February 12, 1976) is a Japanese ice hockey coach. He coached the Japanese national team at the 2015 IIHF Women's World Championship.

References

External links

1976 births
Living people
Place of birth missing (living people)
Ice hockey coaches
Japanese ice hockey forwards